El Bestial Sonido de Ricardo Ray y Bobby Cruz (The Bestial Sound of Ricardo Ray and Bobby Cruz) is the thirteenth studio album released in 1971 by the salsa music duet Richie Ray & Bobby Cruz. Released at the height of their popularity, the album inaugurated a new era in salsa with the inauguration of a new Fania Records subsidiary: Vaya Records. The album, notable for the inclusion of new elements into salsa such as classical music, was an international success, and its title track Sonido Bestial became one of salsa's most popular songs. The album consecrated Richie Ray as a prodigious pianist, capable of playing a fusion of several rhythms and styles.

Critical reception
Critic José A. Estévez, Jr. named the album "a staggering, spellbinding salsa experience" and "an absolute must-have." He also stated that the title track Sonido Bestial "remains one of the most remarkable (and recognizable) tunes of the salsa era". Jaime Torres Torres praised Bobby Cruz vocal performance.

Track listing

Personnel
Ricardo Ray: piano, backing vocals and arrangements
Bobby Cruz: lead and backing vocals, and arrangements
Miki Vimari: lead and backing vocals
Ismael “Cocolía” Rodríguez: first trumpet
Ismael “Maelo” Rodríguez: second trumpet
Manolito González: bongó, cencerro and timbalitos
José “Mañengue” Hidalgo: congas
Charlie “El Pirata” Cotto: timbales
Mike “El Che” Amitin: bass guitar
Johnny Pacheco: Recording Director
Pedrito: Engineer
Fred Weinberg: Sound mix 
Maurice Seymour: Cover Photograph
Izzy Sanabria: Cover design

References

1971 albums
Richie Ray & Bobby Cruz albums
Albums arranged by Richie Ray
Albums arranged by Bobby Cruz